St. Erc's Hermitage is a ruin in the grounds of Slane Castle, between the Church of Ireland church and the Boyne. The building consists of a nave, a chancel and a tower between them. While it is traditionally associated with Saint Erc, the visible ruins have been dated to the 15th or 16th century.

External links
Slane and District History Society | Charities Regulator No 20204734

Ruins in the Republic of Ireland
Archaeological sites in County Meath